The Ai (Douay–Rheims: Hai) was a Canaanite city. According to the Book of Joshua in the Hebrew Bible, it was conquered by the Israelites on their second attempt.  The ruins of the city are popularly thought to be in the modern-day archeological site Et-Tell.

Biblical narrative

According to Genesis, Abraham built an altar between Bethel and Ai.

In the Book of Joshua, chapters 7 and 8, the Israelites attempt to conquer Ai on two occasions. The first, in Joshua 7, fails. The biblical account portrays the failure as being due to a prior sin of Achan, for which he is stoned to death by the Israelites. On the second attempt, in Joshua 8, Joshua, who is identified by the narrative as the leader of the Israelites, receives instruction from God. God tells them to set up an ambush and Joshua does what God says. An ambush is arranged at the rear of the city on the western side. Joshua is with a group of soldiers that approach the city from the front so the men of Ai, thinking they will have another easy victory, chase Joshua and the fighting men from the entrance of the city to lead the men of Ai away from the city. Then the fighting men to the rear enter the city and set it on fire.  When the city is captured, 12,000 men and women are killed, and it is razed to the ground. The king is captured and hanged on a tree until the evening. His body is then placed at the city gates and stones are placed on top of his body. The Israelites then burn Ai completely and "made it a permanent heap of ruins." God told them they could take the livestock as plunder and they did so.

Possible locations

Et-Tell
Edward Robinson (1794–1863), who identified many biblical sites in the Levant on the basis of local place names and basic topography, suggested that Et-Tell or Khirbet Haijah were likely on philological grounds; he preferred the former as there were visible ruins at that site. A further point in its favour is the fact that the Hebrew name Ai means more or less the same as the modern Arabic name et-Tell.

Up through the 1920s a "positivist" reading of the archeology to date was prevalent — a belief that archeology would prove, and was proving, the historicity of the Exodus and Conquest narratives that dated the Exodus in 1440 BC and Joshua's conquest of Canaan around 1400 BC.  And accordingly, on the basis of excavations in the 1920s the American scholar William Foxwell Albright believed that Et-Tell was Ai.

However, excavations at Et-Tell in the 1930s, undertaken by Judith Marquet-Krause, found that there was a fortified city there during the Early Bronze Age, between 3100 and 2400 BCE, after which it was destroyed and abandoned. The excavations found no evidence of settlement in the Middle or Late Bronze Ages. These findings, along with excavations at Bethel, posed problems for the dating that Albright and others had proposed, and some scholars including Martin Noth began proposing that the Conquest had never happened but instead was  an etiological myth; the name meant "the ruin" and the Conquest story simply explained the already-ancient destruction of the Early Bronze city.  Archeologists also found that the later Iron Age I village appeared with no evidence of initial conquest, and the Iron I settlers seem to have peacefully built their village on the forsaken mound, without meeting resistance.

Five main hypotheses exist about how to explain the biblical story surrounding Ai in light of archaeological evidence.  The first is that the story was created later on: Israelites related it to Joshua because of the fame of his great conquest. The second is that people of Bethel inhabited Ai during the time of the biblical story and they were the ones who were invaded. In a third, Albright combined these two theories to present a hypothesis that the story of the Conquest of Bethel, which was only a mile and a half away from Ai, was later transferred to Ai in order to explain the city and why it was in ruins. Support for this position can be found in the Bible, the assumption being that the Bible does not mention the actual capture of Bethel, but might speak of it in memory in Judges 1:22–26. Fourth, Callaway has proposed that the city somehow angered the Egyptians (perhaps by rebelling, and attempting to gain independence), and so they destroyed it as punishment. The fifth is that Joshua's Ai is not to be found at et-Tell, but a different location entirely.

Koert van Bekkum writes that "Et-Tell, identified by most scholars with the city of Ai, was not settled between the Early Bronze and Iron Age I.

See also
Battle of Jericho
Tel Hazor
Battle of Gibeah for similar tactics
Archaeology of Israel

References

External links

Easton's Bible Dictionary

Hebrew Bible battles
Hebrew Bible cities
Torah cities
Canaanite cities
Book of Joshua
Massacres in the Bible
Destroyed cities
Destroyed towns
Former kingdoms
City-states